Praveen Kumar is a sanda fighter from India. He became the world champion at the 2019 World Wushu Championships in Shanghai, China in men's Sanda 48 kg,  and thus became the first Indian male athlete to a win gold medal at Wushu World Championships.

He also won a silver medal at the 2016 Asian Wushu Championships in Taoyuan, Taiwan, in the men's Sanda 48 kg category. In domestic competition, Kumar won a silver medal in the 2014 junior nationals in and a gold medal at the 2015 senior nationals. He is currently serving in the Indian Army.

See also 
 2019 World Wushu Championships

References 

Indian sanshou practitioners
Indian male martial artists
Indian male boxers
Living people
World Games gold medalists
Indian martial arts
People from Haryana
Indian Army personnel
Year of birth missing (living people)
Recipients of the Arjuna Award